The Royal Palace was the residence of the Libyan monarch in the capital city, Tripoli.

Another residence was the Al-Manar Palace in Benghazi, which was donated by King Idris of Libya as the first campus of the University of Libya. Another residence at Bab Zaytun was further to the east in Tobruk.

It was converted into a public library after the coup d'état of Colonel Muammar Gaddafi.

External links 

Houses completed in the 20th century
Buildings and structures in Tripoli, Libya
Libyan monarchy
Libraries in Libya
Palaces in Africa